The France national football team represents the nation of France in international association football. It is fielded by the French Football Federation, the governing body of football in France, and competes as a member of the Union of European Football Associations (UEFA), which encompasses the countries of Europe. The team played its first official international match on 1 May 1904 against Belgium. Since its first competitive match, more than 800 players have made at least one international appearance for the team. As hundreds of players have played for the team since it started officially registering its players in 1904, only players with 20 or more official caps are included.

Jean Ducret became the first French international to reach 20 caps, doing so on 29 March 1914 in a 2–0 defeat to Italy. He was also one of the first permanent captains of the national team. Ducret was later surpassed by defender Raymond Dubly and goalkeeper Pierre Chayriguès, who both played with the national team until 1925. Dubly finished his international career with 31 caps. Three years after retiring from the national team, Dubly's amount was exceeded by Jules Dewaquez, who went on to finish his career with 41 appearances. Dewaquez's record stood for nearly a decade before his amount was equaled by Edmond Delfour in 1938 and later surmounted by Étienne Mattler a year later. Similar to Dubly, Mattler's amount was exceeded, however after two decades, by former Stade de Reims defenders Roger Marche and Robert Jonquet. It was the former player who took over the record outperforming Jonquet by just five caps. Marche's 63 appearances remained the France national team record for appearance-making for 28 years, the longest time between the record being broken and set again. Marche was surpassed by Marius Trésor, who set the record after appearing in an October 1983 friendly match against Spain.

Trésor represented France only once afterward and his 65-cap output was subsequently passed by defender Maxime Bossis and midfielder Michel Platini. Bossis surpassed Trésor during qualifying for the 1986 FIFA World Cup, while Platini went beyond the former Marseille and Bordeaux player at the tournament itself, in which France finished in third place. Both players retired within months of each other as Bossis finished his career occupying the record, which was now at 76 caps, four more than Platini. After appearing at the 1986 FIFA World Cup, Bossis acquired the record of appearing in the most FIFA World Cup matches for France. He was surpassed by goalkeeper Fabien Barthez in 2006. Bossis was passed just six years later by former international teammate Manuel Amoros, who finished his international career with 82 appearances. The 1992–93 UEFA Champions League winner was eventually equaled or outperformed by 13 different players. Of the 13 players, 10 of them played on the team that won the 1998 FIFA World Cup and seven of them went on to become members of the FIFA Century Club, which consists of association football players who have accumulated 100 or more caps. Following the conclusion of UEFA Euro 2000, the record for France national team appearances was held by Didier Deschamps who also became the first French international to reach 100 caps. He was eventually surpassed by defender Marcel Desailly in 2003 who retired at the end of UEFA Euro 2004 with 116 caps. As a result, Desailly became the first player not born in France or the overseas departments and territories to occupy the record. He was overtaken by Lilian Thuram, who broke Desailly's record at the 2006 FIFA World Cup in the team's final group stage match against Togo. He would eventually finish with 142 caps. He is the second player born in an overseas department to hold the record, the first being Trésor. Both players were born in Guadeloupe. The current record holder for appearances with the national team is Hugo Lloris, who made 145 total competitive appearances for the team between 2008 and 2022. Lloris broke Thuram's record at the 2022 FIFA World Cup in the team's quarter final match against England.

Players 
Appearances and goals are composed of FIFA World Cup and UEFA European Championship matches and each competition's required qualification matches, as well as UEFA Nations League matches, FIFA Confederations Cup matches and numerous international friendly tournaments and matches. Players are listed by number of caps, then number of goals scored. If number of goals are equal, the players are then listed alphabetically.

See also 

 List of leading goalscorers for the France national football team
 List of France national football team captains

References

External links 
  Official site 

 
Association football player non-biographical articles